Umar I ibn Muhammad al-Amin or Umar of Borno (died 1881) was Shehu (Sheik) of the Kanem-Bornu Empire and son of Muhammad al-Amin al-Kanemi.

Reign of Umar

Umar came to power at the death of his father in 1837. Umar did not match his father's vitality and gradually allowed the kingdom to be ruled by advisers (wazirs). Umar ruled from 1837 until November 1853 when he was deposed by his brother `Abd ar-Rahman ibn Muhammad al-Amin who became Shehu. The latter only reigned until 1854 when Umar reconquered his throne.

Umar ruled as Shehu for a second time from September 1854 to 1880. Borno began to decline, as a result of administrative disorganization, regional particularism, and attacks by the militant Ouaddai Empire to the east. The decline continued under Umar's sons, and in 1894 Rabih az-Zubayr, leading an invading army from eastern Sudan, conquered Borno.

Dynasty

Footnotes

Bibliography
 Brenner, Louis, The Shehus of Kukawa: A History of the Al-Kanemi Dynasty of Bornu, Oxford Studies in African Affairs (Oxford, Clarendon Press, 1973).
 Cohen, Ronald, The Kanuri of Bornu, Case Studies in Cultural Anthropology (New York: Holt, 1967).
 Denham, Dixon  and Captain Clapperton and the Late Doctor Oudney, Narrative of Travels and Discoveries in Northern and Central Africa, (Boston: Cummings, Hilliards and Co., 1826).
 Isichei, Elizabeth, A History of African Societies to 1870 (Cambridge: Cambridge University Press, 1997), pp. 318–320, .
 Lange, Dierk, 'The kingdoms and peoples of Chad', in General history of Africa, ed. by Djibril Tamsir Niane, IV (London: Unesco, Heinemann, 1984), pp. 238–265.
 Last, Murray, ‘Le Califat De Sokoto Et Borno’, in Histoire Generale De l'Afrique, Rev. ed. (Paris: Presence Africaine, 1986), pp. 599–646.
 Lavers, John, "The Al- Kanimiyyin Shehus: a Working Chronology" in Berichte des Sonderforschungsbereichs, 268, Bd. 2, Frankfurt a. M. 1993: 179-186.

 Palmer, Herbert Richmond, The Bornu Sahara and Sudan (London: John Murray, 1936).

External links
Kanuri Studies Association

Royalty of Borno
1881 deaths
19th-century rulers in Africa
Year of birth unknown
Kanuri warriors
People from Borno State